Amusaron pruinosa is a moth in the family Bombycidae. It was described by Karl Grünberg in 1907. It is found in Cameroon.

References

Endemic fauna of Cameroon
Bombycidae
Moths described in 1907